Talang District is a district (bakhsh) in Qasr-e Qand County, Sistan and Baluchestan province, Iran. At the 2006 census, its population was 14,251, in 3,064 families.  The district has no cities. The district has one rural district (dehestan): Talang Rural District.

References 

Qasr-e Qand County
Districts of Sistan and Baluchestan Province